Secretary to the President or Secretary-General to the President may refer to:

Secretary to the President of Sri Lanka
Secretary to the President of the United States
Secretary-General to the President (Ireland)
Secretary-General to the President (Republic of China)